H&H Magnum may refer to:

.244 H&H Magnum
.275 H&H Magnum
.300 H&H Magnum
.375 H&H Magnum
.400 H&H Magnum
.465 H&H Magnum

See also
List of rifle cartridges
H Magnum, Ivory Coast / French rapper